The Camden railway line is a closed railway line between Campbelltown and Camden in the southwestern outskirts of Sydney, Australia. The passenger service was also known as the 'Camden Tram' and affectionately as 'Pansy'.

History
The Camden railway line was designed as a light railway and construction of the line started in 1881. The line opened on 10 March 1882 and ran between Campbelltown and Camden. The line was originally operated with Baldwin Steam Tram Motors, but these proved unsatisfactory and small 0-6-0 saddle tank locomotives were then used. The line carried freight and passengers but was rarely busy. From 1901, the line was upgraded to railway standard and typically operated by an E class (later Z20 class locomotive in the 1924 reclassification of locomotives) 2-6-4 side-tank locomotives. Starting in the 1950s, the usual locomotive power on the Camden Branch Line was provided by C30 class locomotives. Passenger trains typically ran with a CCA type end-platform carriage, usually boosted in capacity by various independent carriages when the occasion demanded.

Due to the steepness of the ruling gradient of 1 in 19 (reported to be the steepest grade used by adhesion locomotives in Australia) between Campbelltown and Kenny Hill, there were often multiple attempts made at ascending the grade. Passengers would sometimes have to disembark from the train and walk alongside it, leaving their bags on board. When trains could not successfully ascend the hill, the train would be divided and the second half of train (invariably the part where the passengers were carried) would be left standing on the line until the first half of the train had been stowed at Campbelltown. Such delays on the line were a source of annoyance and inconvenience for passengers. The main source of income for the line was the coal loader at Narellan and the Dairy Farmers Milk Co-operative depot at Camden. The line closed on 1 January 1963.

Traces of the original line's route can still be seen along looking up Kirkham Lane from Camden Valley Way, including a wooden bridge along this section towards Narellan.  The elevated section as it passed through this low-lying area are visible – the nearby Nepean River would flood the land around this area when it burst its banks. Cuttings through Kenny Hill are also visible from parts of Narellan Road near the Mount Annan Botanical Gardens. Photographs of the line are on display in the Camden Historic Society Museum in Camden.

The song 'The Camden Tram' by Buddy Williams, which is featured in the repertoire of the Camden Community Band, commemorates the train.

Special working 
Every year, on Good Friday, three or four special trains were run from Sydney to Maryfields, to cater for public attendance to the Via Crucis religious ceremony held on the grounds of the Franciscan Brothers monastery near Campbelltown. This required out-of-the-ordinary working over the branch line, which also included the provision of an additional locomotive at both the front and rear of each train. Maryfields, a platform opposite the entrance to the monastery, had a platform suitable for an 8 or 9-car train.

Stations and route
The intermediate stations from the Campbelltown end were Maryfields (formerly known as 'Rudds Gate'), Kenny Hill, Currans Hill, Narellan, Grahams Hill, Kirkham, and Elderslie, with the line terminating at Camden. These stations have disappeared.

See also 
 Railways in Sydney
 Steepest gradients

References

External links
 Camden Branch – NSWRail.net

Further reading 
 Goodbye, Camden Tram Winney, I.K. & anor Australian Railway Historical Society Bulletin, April 1963
 

Closed regional railway lines in New South Wales
Railway lines opened in 1882
Railway lines closed in 1963
Standard gauge railways in Australia
Camden, New South Wales
1882 establishments in Australia
1963 disestablishments in Australia